Eleonora De Angelis (born 23 April 1967) is an Italian voice actress.

Biography
Born in Rome, De Angelis is the daughter of voice actor Manlio De Angelis and the granddaughter of voice actor Gualtiero De Angelis. She is the official Italian voice actress of Jennifer Aniston as she gave her voice to most of her performances, most notably Rachel Green in Friends. Growing up in a family of voice actors and dubbers, she makes frequent collaborations with her family. She also dubs over the voices of Cameron Diaz, Halle Berry, Téa Leoni, Angelina Jolie, Jennifer Garner, Sarah Michelle Gellar and Jordana Brewster.

Other dubbing roles De Angelis is known for includes Natalie Cook in the Charlie's Angels film series and Mia Toretto in the Fast and the Furious film series. In her animated roles, she voiced Wendy Testaburger in the Italian version of South Park.

Dubbing roles

Animation
Wendy Testaburger in South Park
Wendy Testaburger in South Park: Bigger, Longer & Uncut
Julia in Cowboy Bebop
Dr. Sanchez in ChalkZone

Live action

References

External links
 
 

1967 births
Living people
Actresses from Rome
Italian voice actresses
20th-century Italian actresses
21st-century Italian actresses
Italian voice directors